Michael Burgess (17 April 1932 – 17 June 2021) was an English professional footballer. He played for Bradford (Park Avenue), Leyton Orient, Newport County, Bournemouth & Boscombe Athletic, Halifax Town, Gillingham and Aldershot during a 14-year professional career.

Personal life 
Burgess was born in Montreal, Quebec, Canada.  He died on 17 June 2021 in Dorset at the age of 89.

Football career
He joined Newport County in February 1956 as part of a deal which took Tommy Johnston to Leyton Orient for £4,000. He went on to play 23 times and score seven goals during one and a half seasons in South Wales before leaving at the end of the 1956–57 season.

On the opening day of the 1962–63 season a foul by Burgess injured Crystal Palace winger Stewart Imlach, who was making his Palace debut. This incident is recalled by Gary Imlach in his biography of his father, My Father and other Working Class Football Heroes.

References

1932 births
2021 deaths
English footballers
Bradford (Park Avenue) A.F.C. players
Leyton Orient F.C. players
Newport County A.F.C. players
AFC Bournemouth players
Halifax Town A.F.C. players
Gillingham F.C. players
Aldershot F.C. players
Canterbury City F.C. players
English Football League players
Soccer players from Montreal
Association football defenders